Wiseana signata is a species of moth belonging to the family Hepialidae. It was described by Francis Walker in 1856 and is endemic to New Zealand.

The wingspan is 44–64 mm for males and 58–75 mm for females. The forewings have white scales. The hindwings are yellow fawn or pinkish fawn with a narrow, distinct dark marginal line. Adults are on wing from October to May.

Food plants for the larvae include various species of grass.

References

Hepialidae
Moths described in 1856
Moths of New Zealand
Endemic fauna of New Zealand
Endemic moths of New Zealand